Laura Gamblin (born 26 March 1998 in Senlis) is a French professional squash player. As of November 2017, she was ranked number 168 in the world. She has competed in the main draw of multiple professional PSA tournaments, and won a European championship.

References

1998 births
Living people
French female squash players
People from Senlis
Sportspeople from Oise